The Addison Airport Toll Tunnel, also known as the Addison Airport Tunnel and the Addison Toll Tunnel, is part of the North Texas Tollway Authority (NTTA) system and extends Keller Springs Road under the Addison Airport property.

Built for the NTTA, this toll tunnel enables vehicular traffic to travel under rather than around the airport, which expands traffic capacity and eases the notorious congestion of north Dallas and Addison by providing an east–west route between the Dallas North Tollway and Interstate 35E under the Addison Airport runway. It provides motorists a through passage on Keller Springs Road, which once ended on either side of Addison Airport, as an alternate route to the heavily traveled Belt Line Road and Trinity Mills Road.

The lanes of the Addison Airport Toll Tunnel toll plaza are equipped for electronic toll collection via TollTag.

History 

In September 1997, tunnelling crews started constructing a two-lane vehicular toll tunnel under Addison Airport. The NTTA-commissioned project cost nearly $20 million.

References

External links 
 Addison Airport Toll Tunnel
 North Texas Tollway Authority

Buildings and structures in Dallas County, Texas
Tunnels in Dallas
Non-freeway toll roads
Toll tunnels in the United States
Transportation in Dallas County, Texas
Tunnels completed in 1999
Road tunnels in the United States
Addison, Texas
1999 establishments in Texas